Alessandro Carlo Matthew Busti (born June 30, 2000) is a Canadian soccer player who plays as a goalkeeper in Italy for ASD Valdruento.

Early life 
Busti was born in Toronto, Ontario, Canada to Italian parents and raised in Turin, Italy. Busti grew up playing soccer and tennis. At age 9, he played started to play soccer for Lascaris. When Busti was 10, he joined Juventus.

Club career 
Busti began his playing career with Lascaris at the age of nine, and joined Serie A club Juventus a year later. On December 5, 2017, Busti made his European debut in a 2–0 defeat to Olympiacos in the UEFA Youth League. In August 2018, Busti was named to the Juventus U23 squad for their inaugural season in Serie C. Busti made his debut for Juventus U23 in a Serie C match against A.C. Gozzano on April 18, 2019, coming on as an 89th minute substitute for Mattia Del Favero.

In August 2019, he went on trial with Toronto FC II playing in an exhibition match against the Saskatchewan Selects.

On September 10, 2019, he signed with Serie D club Belluno.

In December 2020, Busti would sign with Serie D club Vado.

In 2021, he joined ASD Valdruento in the sixth tier Promozione.

International career

Youth 
In May 2018, Busti was called up to the Canadian U21 national team for the 2018 Toulon Tournament. He acted as back-up to James Pantemis in the opening game of the tournament, and made his youth debut in a 1–0 victory against Turkey U20s on May 31, 2018. Busti was an unused substitute in the final group game as Canada finished second and failed to progress to the knockout rounds. The team would finish sixth overall after a loss to France in the fifth place playoff.

Busti was named to the Canada u20 team for the 2018 CONCACAF U-20 Championship on October 24, 2018, a week after making his debut for the senior team.

Senior 
In August 2018, Busti was named in the Canada national team for the first time to face the US Virgin Islands in CONCACAF Nations League qualifying the following month. Busti would be an unused substitute in an 8–0 victory. In October 2018, Busti was again named to the roster for the Nations League qualifying game against Dominica. He would make his senior national team debut in this game, recording a clean sheet in a 5–0 victory.

Career Statistics

Club

International

References 

2000 births
Living people
Soccer players from Toronto
Canadian soccer players
Association football goalkeepers
Canada men's youth international soccer players
Canada men's international soccer players
Canadian sportspeople of Italian descent
Juventus Next Gen players
Juventus F.C. players
A.C. Belluno 1905 players
F.C. Vado players
Serie C players
Serie D players
Promozione players
Canadian expatriate soccer players
Expatriate footballers in Italy
Footballers from Turin
Canadian expatriate sportspeople in Italy